Roos Broek (born 28 September 1993) is a Dutch-Australian field hockey player.

Broek was part of the Netherlands women's junior national team that won gold at the 2010 Youth Olympic Games in Singapore.

Broek moved from the Netherlands to Australia to play hockey, and is currently a member of the Australian Women's Development Squad.

References

1993 births
Living people
Australian female field hockey players
Dutch female field hockey players
Field hockey players at the 2010 Summer Youth Olympics
Youth Olympic gold medalists for the Netherlands